Kendrapara Autonomous College is a co-ed non-government autonomous college located in town of Kendrapada, Odisha. The autonomous college was established in the year 1959. In the year 2005 UGC granted this college its autonomous status to run its undergraduate educational curriculum. The college got its accreditation by NAAC with grade A certification in the year 2005. The autonomous college offers students three years of regular undergraduate courses in degree of Arts (B.A), (B.A. Hons), Commerce (B.Com, B.Com. Hons) and Science (B.Sc.) (B.Sc. Hons).

References

Department of Higher Education, Odisha
Autonomous Colleges of Odisha
Kendrapara district
Educational institutions established in 1959
1959 establishments in Orissa